Charles Rollinson Lamb (1860 – February 22, 1942) was an American architect and sculptor.

Born and raised in New York City, he studied under William Sartain at the Art Students' League. He was a member of his father's firm, the J&R Lamb Studios. He was a founding member of the National Sculpture Society. He was best known for ecclesiastical architecture and memorial and historical art. Lamb was the designer of the Dewey Arch in 1899.

In 1888 he married Ella Condie Lamb with whom he had five children. Ella joined the studio creating stained glass designs and murals.

Lamb designed the World War I memorial in Chelsea Park, Manhattan, with a bronze statue of a soldier by Philip Martiny.

Legacy
Ella and Charles' daughter Katharine Lamb Tait (1895–1981) joined J&R Lamb Studios in 1921. She was the head designer from 1936 through 1979. Ella and Charles' son Karl Barre Lamb (1890–1969) joined J&R Lamb Studios in 1923. He was head of the Studio from 1932 through 1969, streamlining the studio to focus solely on glass.

References 

Reps, J. W.: Charles R. Lamb.
Smithsonian:  Charles R. Lamb scrapbook on the Dewey Arch, 1899-1901.

External links
Charles R. Lamb architectural drawings and papers, circa 1897-1911, held by the Avery Architectural and Fine Arts Library, Columbia University

1860 births
1942 deaths
American architects
Artists from New York City
20th-century American sculptors
20th-century American male artists
19th-century American sculptors
American male sculptors
Sculptors from New York (state)
19th-century American male artists